Fimoscolex is a genus of South American earthworm.
Haplotaxida